Savas may refer to:

 Savas, Ardèche, a commune in the Ardèche department, France
 Savaş, a Turkish name
 Savas (Zembillas), American Greek Orthodox metropolitan
 Savas Matsas (born 1947), Greek intellectual and politician
 Savas Papapolitis (1911–1973), Greek politician
 Paul Savas, American politician
 Theodore P. Savas, American publisher and writer
 Tommy Savas (born 1984), American actor and producer

See also
 Savvas (disambiguation)